Hemistylus is a genus of flowering plants belonging to the family Urticaceae.

Its native range is Brazil, Colombia, Ecuador, south-eastern Mexico and Venezuela.

Species:

Hemistylus boehmerioides 
Hemistylus macrostachya 
Hemistylus odontophylla 
Hemistylus velutina

References

Urticaceae
Urticaceae genera
Flora of South America